This is a list of active and extinct volcanoes in Vanuatu.

Volcanoes

See also
Lists of volcanoes

References 

Vanuatu
 
Volcanoes